Meido may refer to:
 French maid or meido in Japanese, a popular costume in cosplay
 , Another name for Yomi, sometimes considered similar to Ne-no-kuni and the Sanzu-no-kawa; the Japanese reading of míngtú, a Buddhist concept of the course of the dead as they enter Diyu Locations in Japanese mythology
 Meido Zangetsuha, a technique of the InuYasha character Sesshomaru's Tenseiga and also of the title character, InuYasha's Tetsusaiga

See also 
 Maïdo, a volcanic peak on the island of Réunion